Casula Mall is a sub-regional shopping centre located in the suburb of Casula, a suburb of Sydney. Its main anchor tenants are Aldi, Coles and a 24hr Kmart and it has over 55 speciality stores.

History 
Casula Mall opened in 1986 and featured a Super Kmart hypermarket and a Franklins supermarket. In 1989 Coles Myer abolished the Super Kmart hypermarket store format in Australia and Super Kmart Casula was divided into a regular Kmart discount department store and a Coles New World supermarket. Casula Mall underwent redevelopment in 1998 and 2007 and now comprises more than 55 stores and 3 anchor tenants. Franklins closed in 2011 and was replaced by Supa IGA. IGA closed its store in 2015 and was replaced by Aldi which opened in late 2016.

Shopping / Facilities 

Major retailers of Casula Mall include one of the first 24hr trading Kmart, Coles and Aldi.

References 

Shopping centres in Sydney
Shopping malls established in 1986
1986 establishments in Australia